The Bergisel Ski Jump, whose stadium has a capacity of 26,000, is a ski jumping hill located in Bergisel in Innsbruck, Austria. It is one of the more important venues in the FIS Ski Jumping World Cup, annually hosting the third competition of the prestigious Four Hills Tournament.

Its first competitions were held in the 1920s using simple wood constructions. The larger hill was first built in 1930 and was rebuilt before the 1964 Winter Olympics for the individual large hill event. Twelve years later, the venue hosted the same event. The hill in its current form was finished in 2003 and was designed by the British Iraqi architect Zaha Hadid.

See also 
 List of ski jumping hills

References

1964 Winter Olympics official report. p. 112. 
1976 Winter Olympics official report. pp. 201–2.

External links

 Austria 2013 Modern Architecture - Stamps of the World for a 2013 stamp

Venues of the 1964 Winter Olympics
Venues of the 1976 Winter Olympics
Venues of the 2012 Winter Youth Olympics
Olympic stadiums
Ski jumping venues in Austria
Four Hills Tournament
Sport in Innsbruck
Olympic ski jumping venues
Buildings and structures in Innsbruck
Zaha Hadid buildings
Tourist attractions in Innsbruck
Sports venues in Tyrol (state)
1930 establishments in Austria
Sports venues completed in 1930